

This is a list of the National Register of Historic Places listings in Riverside County, California.

This is intended to be a complete list of the properties and districts on the National Register of Historic Places in Riverside County, California, United States. Latitude and longitude coordinates are provided for many National Register properties and districts; these locations may be seen together in an online map.

There are 95 properties and districts listed on the National Register in the county, including 2 National Historic Landmarks.

Current listings

|}

Former listings

|}

See also

List of National Historic Landmarks in California
National Register of Historic Places listings in California
California Historical Landmarks in Riverside County, California

References

External links
 NoeHill Travels in California: Historic Sites in Riverside County for a listing of NRHP and California landmarks

Riverside